Prior information may refer to

Prior probability
A prior information notice (PIN) issued in advance of procurement actions for the purposes of government procurement in the European Union